Erythroxylaceae (the coca family) is a family of flowering trees and shrubs consisting of 4 genera and 271 species. The four genera are Aneulophus Benth., Erythroxylum P.Browne, Nectaropetalum Engl., and Pinacopodium Exell & Mendonça. The best-known species are the coca plants, including the species Erythroxylum coca, the source of the substance coca.

References

 
Malpighiales families